Charles-Marie Condé (Saint-Omer (Pas-de-Calais) 25 February 1876 – 13 October 1945) was a French military officer.

In World War II he was a general, and from 2 September 1939 to 20 June 1940, he commanded the 3rd French Army against the German invasion of France.
Between 17 and 20 June, he was also in command of the 2nd Army Group .

He was a prisoner of war between 20 June 1940 and 11 May 1945.

Sources
Generals of World War II
Wikimaginot

1876 births
1945 deaths
French military personnel of World War I
French Army generals of World War II
French generals
French prisoners of war in World War II
World War II prisoners of war held by Germany